The arrondissement of Marseille is an arrondissement of France in the Bouches-du-Rhône department in the Provence-Alpes-Côte d'Azur region. It has 21 communes.

Composition

The communes of the arrondissement of Marseille, and their INSEE codes, are:

 Allauch (13002)
 Aubagne (13005)
 Auriol (13007)
 Belcodène (13013)
 La Bouilladisse (13016)
 Cadolive (13020)
 Carnoux-en-Provence (13119)
 Cassis (13022)
 Ceyreste (13023)
 La Ciotat (13028)
 Cuges-les-Pins (13030)
 La Destrousse (13031)
 Gémenos (13042)
 Marseille (13055)
 La Penne-sur-Huveaune (13070)
 Peypin (13073)
 Plan-de-Cuques (13075)
 Roquefort-la-Bédoule (13085)
 Roquevaire (13086)
 Saint-Savournin (13101)
 Septèmes-les-Vallons (13106)

History

The arrondissement of Marseille was created in 1800. At the March 2017 reorganisation of the arrondissements of Bouches-du-Rhône, it lost one commune to the arrondissement of Aix-en-Provence, and it gained one commune from the arrondissement of Aix-en-Provence.

As a result of the reorganisation of the cantons of France which came into effect in 2015, the borders of the cantons are no longer related to the borders of the arrondissements. The cantons of the arrondissement of Marseille were, as of January 2015:

 Allauch
 Aubagne-Est
 Aubagne-Ouest
 La Ciotat
 Marseille-La Belle-de-Mai
 Marseille-Belsunce
 Marseille-La Blancarde
 Marseille-Le Camas
 Marseille-La Capelette
 Marseille-Les Cinq-Avenues
 Marseille-Les Grands-Carmes
 Marseille-Mazargues
 Marseille-Montolivet
 Marseille - Notre-Dame-du-Mont
 Marseille - Notre-Dame-Limite
 Marseille-Les Olives
 Marseille-La Pointe-Rouge
 Marseille-La Pomme
 Marseille-La Rose
 Marseille - Saint-Barthélemy
 Marseille - Sainte-Marguerite
 Marseille - Saint-Giniez
 Marseille - Saint-Just
 Marseille - Saint-Lambert
 Marseille - Saint-Marcel
 Marseille - Saint-Mauront
 Marseille-Les Trois Lucs
 Marseille-Vauban
 Marseille-Verduron
 Roquevaire

References

Marseille